Manuel Becerra Salazar (born October 8, 1983, Mexico City, Mexico) is a Mexican poet. He is the author of six books of poetry, including his award-winning Canciones para adolescentes fumando en un claro del bosque. He has won five other national poetry prizes for his work. His work appears in three anthologies. He has worked as a translator and teaches creative writing for several foundations and has taught for the Secretary of Culture in Mexico. In 2019, the Emily Dickinson museum selected one of his poems translated in English to be installed in the streets of Amherst, Massachusetts for their project called The Art of Rain Poetry. He has been a poet in residency in the Omi Art Center in New York, the University of Stockton in New Jersey, and the International Writing Program at the University of Iowa. His poetry has been translated to Italian, English, and French.

Published works

Books

Cantata Castrati, (Editorial Colibrí, 2004)
Los alumbrados, (Estado de México, 2008) 
Canciones para adolescentes fumando en un claro del bosque, (Universidad Autónoma de Zacatecas, México, 2011)  
Instrucciones para matar un caballo, (Conaculta/FONCA, México, 2013) 
Al interior del que duerme, una cueva ilustrada, (Monte Carmelo Ediciones, 2020)

Anthologies

El Lejano Oriente en la poesía mexicana, (Vaso Roto Ediciones/ Conaculta) 
Otras voces nos agitan, (Capítulo Siete Ediciones, Ciudad de México, 2019) 
The Americas Poetry Festival of New York, (Arte Poetica Press, NY, 2017)

Awards

References 

1983 births
Living people
Mexican male poets
21st-century Mexican poets
Writers from Mexico City